Sagebrush is a common name of a number of shrubby plant species in the genus Artemisia native to western North America;

Or, the sagebrush steppe ecoregion, having one or more kinds of sagebrush, bunchgrasses and others;

Sagebrush could also refer to:

Businesses and organizations 
 Sagebrush Corporation, which produced library automation software, now owned by Follett Software
 Sagebrush Ranch, brothel in Mound House, Nevada

Disputes 
 Sagebrush Rebellion, a political movement
 Sagebrush War, an armed conflict

Other uses 
 Sagebrush School, literary movement
 Sagebrush scrub, a biome of mid to high elevation Western United States deserts
 The Nevada Sagebrush, the student-run newspaper of the University of Nevada

See also
 University of Nevada Sagebrushers
 Sage (disambiguation)
 Brush (disambiguation)